Victor Alexander Greenidge (born 21 November 1918) is a Panamanian former Negro league pitcher who played in the 1940s.

A native of Panama City, Panama, Greenidge made his Negro leagues debut in 1941 with the New York Cubans. He played for the Panama national baseball team in 1943, and returned to the New York Cubans in 1944.

References

External links
 and Seamheads

1918 births
Possibly living people
New York Cubans players
Baseball pitchers
Panamanian expatriate baseball players in the United States
Sportspeople from Panama City